Alexa Geneva Locke (born October 7, 1988) is a Canadian actress who portrayed young Max Guevara in the TV series Dark Angel.

Personal life
Geneva attended Kitsilano Secondary School for high school. She attended the Sauder School of Business at the University of British Columbia in Vancouver, British Columbia.  She competed in the 2006 and 2010 World Junior Ultimate Championship as a member of Team Canada.

Since August 2017, she is pursuing an MBA at INSEAD in France.

Acting
Locke appeared in eleven episodes of Dark Angel. In 2007, stock footage of her in Dark Angel was used in the action film Hitman.

Filmography

External links 
 

1988 births
Living people
Actresses from Vancouver
Canadian child actresses
Canadian television actresses